Air Liberia was a domestic airline based in Liberia.

History
Formed in 1974 following a merger between Liberian National Airlines, which was established as Liberian National Airways in 1948, and Ducor Air Transport (Datco) to form Air Liberia, the carrier ceased trading in 1990.
It initially operated a prop fleet (Cessna 337's) joined by Britten-Norman Islander & Trislander aircraft in 1975 for scheduled services. In February 1978 an HS 748 was purchased from the manufacturer in order to operate domestic flights. The aircraft was written off in April 1983. A Boeing 737 was used for government VIP operations.

Accidents and incidents
On 19 April 1975, Douglas C-47A EL-AAB was damaged beyond economic repair in a take-off accident at Roberts International Airport, Harbel. All 25 people on board survived.
On 16 April 1983, HS 748 EL-AIH was destroyed when, after taking off from Khartoum Airport, an engine failed. https://aviation-safety.net/database/record.php?id=19830416-0

See also		
 List of defunct airlines of Liberia

References

External links
Air Liberia logo, Museum of Flight

Government-owned airlines
Defunct airlines of Liberia
Airlines established in 1974
Airlines disestablished in 1990
1974 establishments in Liberia
1990 disestablishments in Africa
Companies based in Monrovia